Riva Castle, is a Byzantine coastal fortification situated on a hill where Riva Creek meets the Black Sea in Riva, Beykoz, Greater Istanbul. In Greek mythology, the leader of the Argo sailors, Iason, searching for the Golden Fleece received the iron anchor, hence the village was referred to as Ancyranum during the reign of the Eastern Roman Empire.

The Ottoman Sultan Bayezid I referred to the importance of occupying it after taking over its neighboring castles, Yoros and Şile in 1391 AD (793 AH). It was first recorded in the archives as Revan Kalesi in 1778-1779 AD (1192 AH).

References

Ottoman fortifications
Buildings and structures in Istanbul
Tourist attractions in Istanbul
Byzantine fortifications in Turkey
Ruined castles in Turkey
Castles in Istanbul Province